Pardosa ludia is a species of spider in the genus Pardosa, family Lycosidae. It is endemic to Myanmar. It was described for the first time by Thorell, in 1895.

References 

ludia
Spiders of Asia
Spiders described in 1895